Mallomus is a genus of moths in the family Geometridae.

Species
Mallomus aenea (Butler, 1882)
Mallomus antennata (Mabille, 1885)
Mallomus albipunctaria (Mabille, 1885)
Mallomus scodionata (Mabille, 1885)

References

Geometridae